Theru Vilakku is 1980 Indian Tamil-language film directed by M. A. Kaja. The film stars Vijayan and Deepa. It was released on 7 March 1980.

Plot

Cast 
 Vijayan
 Deepa
 Swarna

Soundtrack 
The music was composed by Gangai Amaran.

Reception 
Kanthan of Kalki, playing on the film's title which means a street lamp, said the lamp was not giving any light, but applauded Swarna's performance.

References

External links 
 

1980 films
1980s Tamil-language films
Films scored by Gangai Amaran